The Surenen Pass (German: Surenenpass) is a high mountain pass across the Urner Alps in the canton of Uri in Central Switzerland.

The pass is traversed by a trail, which connects the village of Altdorf, in the canton of Uri, with the village of Engelberg, in the canton of Obwalden. The trail forms part of the Alpine Pass Route, a long-distance hiking trail across Switzerland between Sargans to the east and Montreux to the west of Switzerland.

See also
 List of mountain passes in Switzerland

References

External links

Surenen Pass on Via Alpina web site
Surenenpass on Hikr web site

Mountain passes of Switzerland
Mountain passes of the Alps
Mountain passes of the canton of Uri